The Phlyctidaceae are a family of lichenized fungi in the order Gyalectales. Species in this family have primarily a tropical distribution, and are usually found growing on bark.

References

Gyalectales
Lichen families
Lecanoromycetes families
Taxa named by David Leslie Hawksworth
Taxa described in 1991